Galette (from the Norman word gale, meaning "flat cake") is a term used in French cuisine to designate various types of flat round or freeform crusty cakes, or, in the case of a Breton galette, a pancake made with buckwheat flour usually with a savoury filling. Of the cake type of galette, one notable variety is the galette des Rois (King cake) eaten on the day of Epiphany. In French Canada the term galette is usually applied to pastries best described as large cookies.

Fruit galette

A common form of galette resembles a type of single crust, free-form pie with a fruit filling and the crust folded partway over the top of the filling. The website joyofbaking.com defines the term galette as "a French term signifying a flat round cake that can be either sweet or savory and while [recipes can use] puff pastry as a base, they can also be made from risen doughs like brioche, or with a sweet pastry crust."

The fruits used in these types of galettes are typically seasonal and can include one or more of apples; berries such as strawberries or blueberries; or stone fruits such as peaches, plums, nectarines, or cherries.  Various spices, zests, or peppers can be added in the preparation process if desired.  The pastry base is often homemade but can also be commercially purchased; leftover supplies such as graham crackers can be employed as well.  Fruit galettes can be served warm or with ice cream.

Bon Appétit magazine has written of such galettes, "They're casually impressive and photogenic, but in that 'Oh, I just threw this together' way. They're rustic and inviting; come as you are. ... Their imperfections are what set them apart—in fact, the less you do, the better they look."

Breton galette

Galette, which is more properly called Breton galette, is also the name given in most French crêperies to savoury buckwheat flour pancakes, while those made from wheat flour, much smaller in size and mostly served with a sweet filling, are branded crêpes. This type of galette is a large, thin pancake mostly associated with the region of Brittany, where it replaced at times bread as basic food, but it is eaten countrywide. Buckwheat was introduced as a crop suitable to impoverished soils and buckwheat pancakes were known in other regions where this crop was cultivated, such as Limousin or Auvergne.

It is frequently garnished with egg, meat, fish, cheese, cut vegetables, apple slices, berries, or similar ingredients. One of the most popular varieties is a galette covered with grated Emmental cheese, a slice of ham, and an egg cooked on the galette. In France this is known as a galette complète (a complete galette). Another variety is a hot sausage wrapped in a galette (called galette saucisse, a tradition of Rennes, Brittany) and eaten like a hot dog.

Creole galette
The Guianan galette (more commonly known as the Creole galette) is a traditional pastry of French Guianan cuisine.  This is a Creole variant of the galette des rois which is eaten as a dessert during Epiphany.

It can be garnished with  cream,  coconut, guava, etc.  It is consumed throughout the Carnival period (from the epiphany to the days of Ash) and preferably accompanied by champagne.

See also
 Bing (Chinese flatbread)
 Crepe maker
 Kouign amann
 List of pancakes
 List of sausage dishes

References

External links 
 

Breton cuisine
Pancakes
Sausage dishes